The golf competitions at the 2018 Mediterranean Games in Tarragona took place between 25 and 28 June at the Costa Daurada Golf Club.

Athletes competed in four events.

Medal summary

(a) denotes an amateur golfer

Source:

Medal table

References

Sports at the 2018 Mediterranean Games
2018
Golf tournaments in Spain
Mediterranean Games